Interstate 80S may refer to:

 The former name of Interstate 76 (Colorado–Nebraska), an Interstate Highway in Colorado and Nebraska in the United States, until 1975
 The former name of Interstate 76 (Ohio–New Jersey), an Interstate Highway in Ohio, Pennsylvania, and New Jersey in the United States, until 1972

80S
Interstate 80